Nenad Nonković (born 1 October 1970) is a Serbian former professional footballer who played as a midfielder.

Club career
In October 1995, Nonković joined K League side Ilhwa Chunma with Ljubiša Ranković.

In November 1996, Nonković joined a Belgian side on loan

He also played for Tampereen Pallo-Veikot.

Honours
Ilhwa Chunma
 K League 1: 1995
 Asian Club Championship: 1995

References

External links
 
 Nenad Nonković Profile at Playmaker

Yugoslav footballers
Serbian footballers
Association football midfielders
K League 1 players
Seongnam FC players
Serbian expatriate sportspeople in South Korea
Expatriate footballers in South Korea